Asriel is son of Manasseh in the Bible.

Asriel may also refer to:
Asriel (band), a Japanese rock band
Lord Asriel, a character in Philip Pullman's His Dark Materials trilogy
Asriel Dreemurr, a character in the 2015 video game Undertale

See also
Azrael (disambiguation)
Azriel (disambiguation)